Robin F. C. Farrow is a crystallographer. Farrow, an employee of IBM at the time, was elected a fellow of the American Physical Society in 1998, "[f]or pioneering the development of molecular beam epitaxy to grow and study epitaxial semiconductors, metastable phases, dielectrics, magnetic elements and alloys."

References

Living people
IBM people
Year of birth missing (living people)
20th-century American physicists
American crystallographers
21st-century American physicists
Fellows of the American Physical Society